Ihráč is a village and municipality in Žiar nad Hronom District in the Banská Bystrica Region of central Slovakia.

History
In historical records, the village was first mentioned in 1388 (Graach). It belonged to Šášov, and in the 17th century to Mine Chamber.

Genealogical resources

The records for genealogical research are available at the state archive "Statny Archiv in Banska Bystrica, Slovakia"

 Roman Catholic church records (births/marriages/deaths): 1710-1896 (parish B)

See also
 List of municipalities and towns in Slovakia

External links
https://web.archive.org/web/20080111223415/http://www.statistics.sk/mosmis/eng/run.html.  
http://www.e-obce.sk/obec/ihrac/ihrac.html
http://www.kremnica.sk/sk/index.php?option=com_content&task=view&id=46&Itemid=86
Surnames of living people in Ihrac

Villages and municipalities in Žiar nad Hronom District